Nasser Al Shami (born June 27, 1982) is a Syrian boxer, who competed in the heavyweight division (– 91 kg) at the 2004 Summer Olympics and won a bronze medal. Nasser Al-Shami was allegedly injured on 4 July 2011 by Syrian security forces while protesting against the Syrian government of Bashar Al-Assad.

Career 
At the 2002 Asian Games he was defeated by Shoukat Ali and won the bronze medal. He qualified for the Athens Games by winning the gold medal at the 2004 Asian Amateur Boxing Championships in Puerto Princesa, Philippines. In the final he defeated Kazakhstan's Pavel Storozhuk.

Olympics 2004:
 Defeated Emmanuel Izonritei (Nigeria) 30-17
 Defeated Vugar Alakparov (Azerbaijan) DQ 4 (1:40)
 Lost to Odlanier Solis Fonte (Cuba) RSC 3 (1:29)

At the 2006 Asian Games he lost to Uzbek Jasur Matchanov by walkover.

Injury 
On July 4, 2011, Al Shami participated in the 2011 Syrian uprisings against the Syrian government, where he joined the mass protests in the city of Hama, Syria. On that day, he was allegedly injured by government security forces.

References

External links
 
 

1982 births
Living people
Syrian male boxers
Olympic boxers of Syria
Olympic bronze medalists for Syria
Olympic medalists in boxing
Medalists at the 2004 Summer Olympics
Boxers at the 2004 Summer Olympics
Asian Games medalists in boxing
Boxers at the 2002 Asian Games
Boxers at the 2006 Asian Games
Asian Games bronze medalists for Syria
Medalists at the 2002 Asian Games
Medalists at the 2006 Asian Games
Heavyweight boxers